Luis De Filippis is a Canadian- Italian film director and screenwriter from Toronto, Ontario, Canada. She is most noted for her 2017 short film For Nonna Anna, which was a Canadian Screen Award nominee for Best Live Action Short Drama at the 7th Canadian Screen Awards in 2019. The film went on to receive a Special Jury Prize at Sundance.

De Filippis, was also the winner of the Emerging Canadian Artist award at the 2018 Inside Out Film and Video Festival.

Something You Said Last Night, her debut feature film, is slated to premiere in the Discovery program at the 2022 Toronto International Film Festival.

References

External links

21st-century Canadian screenwriters
Film directors from Toronto
Writers from Toronto
Canadian people of Italian descent
LGBT film directors
Canadian LGBT screenwriters
Canadian transgender writers
Canadian Film Centre alumni
Living people
Year of birth missing (living people)
Transgender screenwriters
21st-century Canadian LGBT people